The Cosmopterigidae  are a family of insects (cosmet moths) in the order Lepidoptera. These are small moths with narrow wings whose tiny larvae feed internally on the leaves, seeds and stems of their host plants. About 1500 species are described. The taxonomic family is most diverse in the Australian and Pacific region with about 780 species.

Several genera formerly included here have been moved to the Agonoxeninae.

Taxonomy
The family consists of four subfamilies and these genera:
Subfamily Antequerinae Hodges, 1978
Subfamily Chrysopeleiinae Mosher, 1916
Subfamily Cosmopteriginae Heinemann & Wocke, 1876
Adeana 
Allotalanta
Anatrachyntis 
Anoncia
Aphanosara 
Archisopha 
Ashibusa 
Axiarcha
Clemmatista  
Coccidiphila 
Cosmopterix
Diatonica 
Diversivalva 
Dorodoca
Dromiaulis
Ecballogonia 
Echinoscelis
Endograptis   
Eralea
Eteobalea 
Hodgesiella 
Hyposmocoma
Glaphyristis 
Haplochrois 
Heureta 
Heterotactis 
Idiostyla
Iressa
Ischnobathra    
Isidiella 
Isorrhoa 
Labdia
Leptozestis
Macrobathra 
Melanocinclis
Mimodoxa
Morphotica
Mothonodes
Opszyga
Otonoma
Paratheta
Parathystas
Passalotis  
Pebobs
Pechyptila
Persicoptila
Phaneroctena 
Pyroderces 
Ramphis 
Ressia 
Rhadinastis
Sematoptis
Stagmatophora
Synploca 
Syntomaula 
Tanygona 
Teladoma 
Tetraconta 
Tolliella
Triclonella 
Trissodoris 
Ulochora
Urangela 
Vulcaniella
Subfamily Scaeosophinae Meyrick, 1922
Incertae sedis
Acleracra 
Aganoptila 
Amblytenes 
Apothetodes
Calanesia 
Clarkeophlebia 
Colonophora 
Crobylophanes 
Dynatophysis 
Falcatariella
Griphocosma
Haplophylax
Harpograptis
Hedroxena
Herlinda
Homosaces
Ischnangela
Melanozestis 
Meleonoma 
Melnea 
Meneptila 
Metagrypa 
Microzestis
Minivalva
Neachandella
Neomelanesthes
Orthromicta 
Pauroptila
Phepsalostoma
Phosphaticola 
Protorhiza 
Pseudascalenia 
Pycnagorastis 
Pyretaulax 
Schendylotis
Semolina
Sindicola 
Spiroterma  
Stromatitica 
Strophalingias
Thectophila
Trachydora
Zanclarches

Selected former genera
Eritarbes
Lallia
Scaeothyris
Xestocasis

See also
List of cosmopterigid genera

References

External links

Cosmopterigidae
Revised Checklist of Cosmopterigidae in Neotropical Region
Revised Checklist of Cosmopterigidae in America north of Mexico
Cosmopterigidae at Fauna Europaea
Family Classification

 
Moth families